Dara is a given name used for both males and females, with more than one origin. Dara is found in the Bible's Old Testament Books of Chronicles. Dara [דרע] was a descendant of Judah (son of Jacob). (The Bible. 1 Chronicles 2:6). Dara (also known as Darda דרדע) was one of four men noted for great wisdom, but exceeded by King Solomon (1 Kings 4:31). In Persian Dara (Persian: دارا) is a masculine name and a variant of Darius. In contemporary Persian, it means "rich", "well-off" and "well-to-do". In Hebrew Dara means compassion or pearl of wisdom. In Urdu, the name is given to baby boys and its meaning is "Possessor" or  "sovereign" and "Halo"(of the moon). It can also mean "sovereign" or "lord", a meaning shared with the Sikh language.  In Parsi, Dara means "Bell" or "Pendant" 

In Kazakh, the name means special, one of a kind, only one, and is a feminine name. In old Bulgaria and North Macedonia, Macedonian and Serbian language (Serbia), Dara means Gift, or to give a gift, its meaning directly derives from "dar", which means "gift". In Khmer, Thai and Lao, Dara is a unisex name meaning "star". In Punjabi, Dara means "leader". 

In Irish, Dara can mean either "oak" or "wise". Dara is also frequently used in Ireland (and the United States), as either a masculine or a feminine given name, and it also occurs as a surname. The spelling varies, with variations including Daire, Darragh and Daragh. The Irish form is probably derived from doire, the Irish word for "oak tree", though as a surname it may be a version of the Irish name Mac Dubhdara. In Irish and Scottish Gaelic, dara means "second". In Javanese, Dara (in which the letters A are pronounced /ɔ/ by the majority of the speakers, slightly like the pronunciation of the letter å in Danish and Norwegian) means "dove" or "pigeon".

Because of the tone mark in Yoruba Language, Dara is also a short form of Oluwashindara which means "Wonder" (God still does wonder).

In Indonesian, Dara means "girl", "young woman", or "virgin". As indicated by these meanings, Dara is a feminine name in Indonesian.

The word "Odara" derives from the Brazilian indigenous Ioruba word dara, meaning "gorgeous." In African-American culture, the name Dara is of Bermudian origin, also meaning "beautiful". In Telugu, Dara means "come". In Gujarati Dara means "every one"  In the Swahili version Dara also means "the beautiful one".

People 
 Dara, South Korean singer, actress and TV presenter, real name Sandara Park
 Dara Calleary, Irish politician 
 Dara Fitzpatrick, Irish Helicopter Pilot
 Dara Bubamara, Serbian singer
 Dara Hayes, birth name of the Australian DJ Tigerlily 
 Dara Horn, U S novelist 
 Dara Murphy, Irish politician
 Dara Nusserwanji Khurody (1906–1983), Indian dairy entrepreneur
 Darashaw Nosherwan Wadia (1883–1969), Indian geologist
 Dara Ó Briain, Irish comedian and TV presenter
Dara O'Shea, Irish Association Football Player
 Dara Rasmi , princess of Chiang Mai 
 Dara Reneé, American actress
 Dara Khosrowshahi, Iranian-American businessman, CEO of Uber
 Dara Rolins, Slovak recording artist 
 Dara Shikoh, Indian prince 
 Dara Singh, Indian professional wrestler  
 Dara Singh (Bajrang Dal), serial killer
 Dara Strolovitch, political scientist from United States of America 
 Dara Torres, U S swimmer

Fictional characters 
 Sumerian God Enki was also known as "Dara-Mah" 
 Dara is a young elf from the tv show Witcher. 
 Dara is a gypsy from the brazilian novel Explode Coração
 Dara is an elder from Caer Pelyn village from Fire Emblem: Sacred Stones
 Dara Shirazi, protagonist of the book The Electric Heir.

Other meanings 

Dara is a gotra (clan) of certain Jats and Punjabis found in India. Members of the Dara gotra are found mainly in Rajasthan (majority), Delhi and Haryana in India. Dara mostly belong to the Khatri caste.
In the Sudan, it is also known as Gbaya-Dara, a Central Sudan language of South Sudan.  It is one of the Kresh Languages.  Though it is commonly called Gbaya, it is not one of the Abaya languages, which are in the Ubangian family.
In Urdu, Dara is a short form of Darius.
In Kannada, Dara's word (dAra) means thread. 
It is the name of a male doll, and Dara and Sara are sold as "Iran's alternative to Ken and Barbie". It is the descendant of the Old Persian name Darayaush (Darius)
 In Meranau Dara is a Blood.
 In ancient Sumerian language, Babylonian-Akkadian Cuneiform Tablet writing Dara means "blood"

See also
List of Irish-language given names

References

Given names